Guns of Banaras is an Indian Hindi-language action film directed by Sekhar Suri. It is a remake of the 2007 Tamil film Polladhavan. The film stars Karan Nath and Nathalia Kaur in leading roles and Zarina Wahab, Vinod Khanna, Shilpa Shirodkar, Abhimanyu Singh and Tej Sapru in supporting roles.

The film marks the comeback of Karan Nath after 11 years and Shilpa Shirodkar after 20 years.

Cast 
 Karan Nath as Guddu
 Nathalia Kaur as Hema
 Ganesh Venkatraman as Vikram Singh
 Abhimanyu Singh as Brijesh Singh
 Shilpa Shirodkar Brijesh Singh's wife
 Zarina Wahab as Guddu's mother
 Vinod Khanna as Guddu's father
 Tanvi Rao as Guddu's sister
 Mohan Agashe as Triloki
 Tej Sapru as Hema's father
 Girish Sahdev as STF officer
 Salim Baig as Tiwari
 Ashok Pathak as Suleman

Soundtrack

Its songs are written by Sameer Anjaan and composed by Sohail Sen.

Reception 
The Times of India gave the film two out of five stars and wrote that "charismatic Karan Nath then swoops in with his engaging performance, and stays true to his character throughout the film.... What Guns of Banaras primarily lacks is a convincing motive for the protagonist to sail through. So, save yourself from this unpleasant ride."

References

External links 

2020s Hindi-language films
2020 films
2020 action films
Hindi remakes of Tamil films
Films directed by Sekhar Suri
Indian action films